Commissioners Landing is a focal point along Boston's Charles River Esplanade, in the U.S. state of Massachusetts. Designed by Arthur Shurcliff during the 1930s, the landing features a granite wall and approximately  balustrade, with steps leading to the river. Inscriptions at each end commemorate the Metropolitan Park Commission and the Metropolitan District Commission. The landing also serves as a dock.

References

External links
 

Charles River Esplanade